Water World, Water world, or Waterworld may refer to:

Film and television
Waterworld, 1995 science fiction film
Waterworld: A Live Sea War Spectacular, show featured at many Universal Studios parks around the world based on the 1995 film
Waterworld, ITV documentary series presented by Timothy West, about 'the people who live and work on the canals of the Midlands'

Games
Waterworld (video game), trio of video games based on the film Waterworld
Waterworld (pinball), a pinball machine based on the film Waterworld
Waterworld, third game in the Swordquest series of games by Atari for the Atari 2600

Music
Waterworld (Binary Star album), first album from Michigan hip hop duo Binary Star
Waterworld (Leak Bros. album), 2003 album from underground rappers Cage and Tame One
 "Water World", a song by Kidsongs

Parks
Water World, Colorado, recreational water park in Federal Heights, Colorado
Waterworld, Hamilton, water park in Hamilton, New Zealand
Waterworld California, water park in Concord, California
Water World, Stoke-on-Trent, indoor water park in Festival Park
WaterWorld Safari, former water park in Phoenix, Arizona, now Six Flags Hurricane Harbor Phoenix
Water World, Lloret de Mar, water park in Lloret de Mar, Spain
WaterWorld Themed Waterpark (Ayia Napa), Cyprus

Science
Ocean world, a planetary body possessing a significant amount of water
Ocean planet, a hypothetical type of planet completely covered in water

See also
Ocean World (disambiguation)
Water planet (disambiguation)
Waterland (disambiguation)
Marine World (disambiguation)
Sea World (disambiguation)
Water park